Jay Light is an oboist and author.  He is a native of Philadelphia.  His teachers were John de Lancie, Charles M. Morris, and Norman Wells, jr., all of the Philadelphia Orchestra.  He is a 1963 graduate of the Curtis Institute of Music. He was principal oboist of the Philadelphia Lyric and Grand Opera Companies (1962–64) and L'orchestre Symphonique de Quebec (1964–66). He served in the U.S. Army as a military journalist and Armed Forces TV news anchor from 1966-69. He taught at the Interlochen Arts Academy (1969–71) and earned an MM degree from Michigan State University in 1972. Beginning in 1974, Light was principal oboist for the Des Moines Symphony.  He was a member of the Drake University faculty from 1972-2002. He has performed at the Berkshire (Tanglewood) Festival, the Festival of Two Worlds in Spoleto, Italy, and the Aspen Festival. Light retired in 2002 and lives in Fort Myers Beach, FL.

Author
 The Oboe Reed Book, copyright 1983.
 Essays for Oboists, copyright 1994.

External links
 Retirement Announcement

Living people
Year of birth missing (living people)
Curtis Institute of Music alumni
Drake University faculty
American classical oboists
Male oboists
Musicians from Philadelphia
Place of birth missing (living people)
Classical musicians from Pennsylvania